The 2014–15 Tulsa Golden Hurricane men's basketball team represented the University of Tulsa during the 2014–15 NCAA Division I men's basketball season. The Golden Hurricane, led by first year head coach Frank Haith, played their home games at the Reynolds Center and were members of the American Athletic Conference. They finished the season 23–11, 14–4 in American Athletic play to finish in second place. They advanced to the semifinals of the American Athletic tournament where they lost to UConn. They were invited to the National Invitation Tournament where they defeated William & Mary in the first round before losing in the second round to Murray State.

Previous season
The Golden Hurricane finished the season 21–13, 13–3 in C-USA play, to finish in a four-way tie for the C-USA regular-season championship. They were champions of the C-USA tournament to earn an automatic bid to the NCAA tournament, where they lost in the second round to UCLA.

Departures

Recruiting

Class of 2014 commitments

Roster

Schedule

|-
!colspan=9 style="background:#084c9e; color:#CFB53B;"| Exhibition

|-
!colspan=9 style="background:#084c9e; color:#CFB53B;"| Non-conference regular season

|-
!colspan=9 style="background:#084c9e; color:#CFB53B;"| Conference regular season

|-
!colspan=9 style="background:#084c9e; color:#CFB53B;"| American Athletic Conference tournament

|-
!colspan=9 style="background:#084c9e; color:#CFB53B;"| NIT

References

Tulsa Golden Hurricane men's basketball seasons
Tulsa
Tulsa
2014 in sports in Oklahoma
2015 in sports in Oklahoma